NPD may refer to:

Politics 
 National Democratic Party of Germany, a far-right political party in Germany; after its German language name, Nationaldemokratische Partei Deutschlands
 New Democratic Party of Canada, a political party in Canada, through its French language acronym NPD, standing for Nouveau Parti Démocratique

Sciences 
 Narcissistic personality disorder, a cluster B personality disorder 
 Nitrogen–phosphorus detector, a detector used in chromatography
 Non-parental ditype, in tetrad genetic analysis
 Nuclear Power Demonstration, an early power-producing nuclear reactor in Canada

Other 
 NPD Group, a sales and market research company (formerly National Purchase Diary)
 New product development, the process of bringing a new product or service to market
 New Pudsey railway station, in England; National Rail station code NPD
 Norwegian Petroleum Directorate, Norwegian government agency